Lepidophloeus is a genus of beetles in the family Laemophloeidae, containing the following species:

 Lepidophloeus exquisitus Grouvelle
 Lepidophloeus minusculus Grouvelle

References

Cucujoidea genera
Laemophloeidae